Rajneesh Mishra (born 20 October 1978) is an Indian cricketer. He played in 16 first-class and 30 List A matches for Uttar Pradesh from 1999 to 2007.

See also
 List of Uttar Pradesh cricketers

References

External links
 

1978 births
Living people
Indian cricketers
Uttar Pradesh cricketers
Cricketers from Lucknow